John Franklin Shafroth (June 9, 1854February 20, 1922) was an American politician who served as a representative, member of the United States Senate, and Governor of Colorado.

Early life 
Born in Fayette, Missouri, he attended the common schools and graduated from the University of Michigan at Ann Arbor in 1875. He studied law and was admitted to the bar in 1876 and began practice in Fayette. He moved to Denver, Colorado, in 1879 and continued the practice of law. Beginning in 1889, one of the attorneys he practiced in partnership with for several years was Charles W. Waterman, later a US Senator.

His son, John F. Shafroth Jr., later a vice admiral in the US Navy during World War II, was born on 31 March 1887.

Political career 

He was city attorney from 1887 to 1891 and was elected as a Republican to the 54th Congress as a representative. He then joined other Colorado officials, such as Senator Henry M. Teller, in leaving the Republicans to join the Silver Republican Party, the third party on whose ticket he was re-elected to the 55th, 56th, and 57th Congresses. To the 58th Congress, he presented credentials as a Democratic member-elect. Thus, he served in the House from March 4, 1895 to his resignation on February 15, 1904, when he declared that fraud in 29 electoral precincts made him unable to assert that he had legitimately won the election and requested for his opponent, Robert W. Bonynge, to replace him. Subsequently, Shafroth was often referred to (sometimes admiringly, sometimes sarcastically) as "Honest John."

Shafroth was Governor of Colorado from 1909 to 1913 and was instrumental in bringing in Colorado's ballot initiative institutions. In 1912, he was elected as a Democrat to the Senate, where he served one term, from March 4, 1913, to March 3, 1919; he was an unsuccessful candidate for re-election in 1918. While a Senator, Shafroth was chairman of the Committee on Pacific Islands and Puerto Rico (63rd to 65th Congresses); the leading Senate sponsor of the Jones-Shafroth Act of 1917, which granted citizenship to Puerto Ricans; and a member of the Committee on the Philippines (65th Congress).

Later life and death 

After leaving the Senate, he served as chairman of the War Minerals Relief Commission from 1919 to 1921.

He died in 1922 and was interred in Fairmount Cemetery in Denver. His personal and official papers are archived at several locations including the Colorado State Archives (gubernatorial papers), the Colorado Historical Society Library, and the Denver Public Library's Western History and Genealogy Department.

References

External links

Governor John F. Shafroth Collection at the Colorado State Archives

1854 births
1922 deaths
People from Fayette, Missouri
Republican Party members of the United States House of Representatives from Colorado
Silver Republican Party members of the United States House of Representatives from Colorado
Democratic Party members of the United States House of Representatives from Colorado
Democratic Party United States senators from Colorado
Democratic Party governors of Colorado
Governors of Colorado
Members of the United States House of Representatives removed by contest
Politicians from Columbia, Missouri
University of Michigan alumni